Lars van der Haar (born 23 July 1991 in Amersfoort, Netherlands) is a Dutch professional cyclo-cross and road cyclist, who currently rides for UCI Continental team .

Career
Van der Haar joined the development team of the  professional squad, for the 2014 season. He was subsequently promoted to the senior team for the 2015 season.

Personal life
In July 2019, he married fellow cyclist Lucy Garner.

Major results

Road
2013
 5th Overall Tour d'Azerbaïdjan
2014
 Oberösterreichrundfahrt
1st  Points classification
1st Stage 1
 8th Ronde van Overijssel

Cyclo-cross

2007–2008
 1st Junior Hamme
 3rd National Junior Championships
2008–2009
 1st  National Junior Championships
 2nd  UEC European Junior Championships
 2nd Overall Junior Superprestige
1st Gieten
2nd Gavere
2nd Diegem
3rd Ruddervoorde
3rd Hamme
3rd Vorselaar
 2nd Overall UCI Junior World Cup
2nd Tábor
2nd Heusden-Zolder
2010–2011
 1st  UCI World Under-23 Championships
 1st  UEC European Under-23 Championships
 1st  National Under-23 Championships
 1st  Overall UCI Under-23 World Cup
2nd Pontchâteau
3rd Koksijde
3rd Kalmthout
3rd Hoogerheide
 1st Overall Under-23 Gazet van Antwerpen
1st Essen
1st Oostmalle
2nd Hasselt
2nd Lille
3rd Koppenberg
 1st Under-23 Cauberg
 2nd Overall Under-23 Superprestige
1st Zonhoven
1st Gieten
1st Diegem
2nd Gavere
2nd Middelkerke
2011–2012
 1st  UCI World Under-23 Championships
 1st  UEC European Under-23 Championships
 1st  National Under-23 Championships
 1st  Overall UCI Under-23 World Cup
1st Tábor
1st Liévin
1st Hoogerheide
 1st Overall Under-23 Superprestige
1st Gavere
1st Gieten
1st Diegem
2nd Zonhoven
2nd Hamme
2nd Middelkerke
3rd Ruddervoorde
 1st Overall Under-23 Gazet van Antwerpen
1st Koppenberg
1st Hasselt
1st Baal
2nd Lille
3rd Essen
 1st Las Vegas
 1st Harderwijk
 1st Under-23 Kalmthout
 1st Under-23 Cauberg
2012–2013
 1st  National Championships
 1st Rucphen
 UCI Under-23 World Cup
2nd Tábor
2nd Hoogerheide
 3rd  UCI World Championships
2013–2014
 1st  National Championships
 1st  Overall UCI World Cup
1st Cauberg
1st Tábor
1st Heusden-Zolder
2nd Rome
 1st Surhuisterveen
 1st Crossquer
 Superprestige
2nd Gieten
 Bpost Bank Trophy
2nd Lille
 2nd Las Vegas
 2nd Overijse
 2nd Kalmthout
 2nd Mechelen
 3rd Brabant
2014–2015
 1st Surhuisterveen
 1st Brabant
 1st Rucphen
 2nd Overall UCI World Cup
1st Cauberg
1st Heusden-Zolder
2nd Namur
 Bpost Bank Trophy
2nd Baal
 2nd Las Vegas
 2nd Woerden
 2nd Heerlen
 3rd   UCI World Championships
 3rd National Championships
 3rd Overall Superprestige
2nd Gieten
2nd Spa-Francorchamps
3rd Zonhoven
 Soudal Classics
3rd Neerpelt
2015–2016
 1st  UEC European Championships
 1st Woerden
 1st Boom
 2nd  UCI World Championships
 2nd National Championships
 2nd Overall UCI World Cup
1st Cauberg
3rd Heusden-Zolder
3rd Lignières-en-Berry
 3rd Overall Superprestige
2nd Gieten
3rd Diegem
 BPost Bank Trophy
3rd Ronse
3rd Koppenberg
3rd Antwerpen
 3rd Mechelen
2016–2017
 UCI World Cup
1st Hoogerheide
 1st Woerden
 1st Rucphen
 Brico Cross
2nd Hulst
 3rd National Championships
 DVV Trophy
3rd Koppenberg
 3rd Surhuisterveen
2017–2018
 DVV Trophy
1st Ronse
3rd Koppenberg
 1st Woerden
 2nd  UEC European Championships
 2nd National Championships
 UCI World Cup
2nd Koksijde
 Superprestige
3rd Zonhoven
3rd Boom
3rd Ruddervoorde
 3rd Iowa City
2018–2019
 Brico Cross
1st Geraardsbergen
2nd Hulst
 1st Rucphen
 1st Woerden
 2nd National Championships
 UCI World Cup
3rd Tábor
 Soudal Classics
3rd Leuven
2019–2020
 1st Woerden
 2nd National Championships
 3rd Overall Superprestige
2nd Gavere
 UCI World Cup
3rd Tábor
 Rectavit Series
3rd Leuven
3rd Neerpelt
2020–2021
 X²O Badkamers Trophy
2nd Koppenberg
2nd Kortrijk
 3rd  UEC European Championships
 Superprestige
3rd Ruddervoorde
3rd Heusden-Zolder
 Ethias Cross
3rd Beringen
 3rd Oostmalle
 3rd Mol
2021–2022
 1st  UEC European Championships
 1st  National Championships
 UCI World Cup
1st Tábor
2nd Iowa City
2nd Zonhoven
2nd Hoogerheide
3rd Hulst
 3rd Overall Superprestige
1st Gavere
3rd Boom
 2nd  UCI World Championships
 Ethias Cross
2nd Lokeren
2nd Beringen
3rd Maldegem
 X²O Badkamers Trophy
3rd Koppenberg
3rd Lille
2022–2023
 1st  National Championships
 1st Overall Superprestige
2nd Niel
2nd Merksplas
2nd Middelkerke
3rd Ruddervoorde
3rd Heusden-Zolder
 1st Waterloo
 1st Woerden
 2nd Overall X²O Badkamers Trophy
1st Koppenberg
2nd Kortrijk
2nd Lille
3rd Brussels
 2nd  UEC European Championships
 2nd Oostmalle
 UCI World Cup
2nd Tábor
2nd Maasmechelen
3rd Waterloo
3rd Overijse
 Exact Cross
2nd Sint Niklaas
3rd Beringen
3rd Meulebeke

References

External links

Dutch male cyclists
Living people
1991 births
Cyclo-cross cyclists
Sportspeople from Amersfoort
20th-century Dutch people
21st-century Dutch people
Cyclists from Utrecht (province)